Jaybird is a Utah-based consumer electronics company owned by Logitech. The company designs and manufactures headphones and wearable activity trackers. The company is mainly known for its line of wireless Bluetooth sports headsets. Jaybird was founded in 2006 by Australian entrepreneur Judd Armstrong.

Company history
Jaybird was founded by Australian entrepreneur Judd Armstrong in 2006. An athlete himself, Armstrong was disappointed with the performance of headphones available at the time, and wanted to create a product for himself that would be sweat-resistant and non-restrictive for physical activity. Armstrong placed a few of his prototype products online for sale to recoup production cost. After receiving positive feedback from the public, he founded JayBirdGear LLC in Salt Lake City, Utah in 2006.

The company's first Bluetooth headset, the JB100 Freedom, was launched in late 2007.
In 2014, the company was listed for the first time amongst the 5 top-selling premium headphones along with Beats, Bose, Sennheiser, and Sony, according to market research company NPD Group.

On April 12, 2016, Logitech acquired the company for $50 million.

In August 2019, Jaybird released the first generation of “Vista” wireless Bluetooth earbuds. In 2021, Jaybird released the next iteration, “Vista 2” wireless Bluetooth earbuds.

In June 2021, Jaybird debuted the release of the Vista 2 model of Bluetooth earbuds, which are fully wireless and feature active noise cancellation and what Jaybird calls "SurroundSense."

Products
JF3 Freedom- Bluetooth headset
Bluebuds X - Bluetooth headset
X2 - Bluetooth headset
Reign - activity tracker wristband and mobile app
Freedom (2016 model) - Bluetooth headset
X3 - Bluetooth headset
Run - Bluetooth earbuds
Tarah - Bluetooth headset 
X4 - Bluetooth headset 
 Tarah Pro - Bluetooth headset 
Run XT - Bluetooth earbuds
Vista - Bluetooth earbuds
Vista 2 - Bluetooth earbuds

Reception
The company's "X2" headset model released in 2015 has been included in "Best Headphones" lists by technology and gadget publishers such as Engadget, TechCrunch, and PC Magazine. Tim Gideon, writing for PC Magazine, rated the headset 4 out of 5 stars, and praised it for its "high quality audio performance," and for being "ideal for athletes who need a very secure fit for intense training." Jeff Dunn from Business Insider included the X2 in his list of "best headphones for working out." Dunn commented, "For the best sound from an exercise-oriented headphone that isn’t outrageously overpriced, go with the Jaybird X2." Dunn warned, however, that finding the best fit for each individual user could take time to set up as the headset is shipped with rubber buds, foam earbuds, and fins of various sizes for the user to configure to their ear size.

Jaybird's fitness tracker, "Reign," released in 2014, was met with mixed reviews. Many reviewers praised its ability to determine the optimal time for a user to exercise by tracking their heart rate variability, but criticized its companion mobile application. Slashgear reviewer Nate Swanner wrote, "Reign is just as good as anything else out there, and much better for workout enthusiasts than many. Start comparing platforms, though, and Reign has a lot of work ahead of it." In her critical review for PC Magazine, author Jill Duffy surmised: "The Jaybird Reign puts unique functionality into an all-day activity tracker and mobile app, but it ignores basic features that make fitness gadgets truly usable."

References

External links
 

Electronics companies established in 2006
Manufacturing companies based in Salt Lake City
Headphones manufacturers
Activity trackers
Wearable devices
Logitech
Audio equipment manufacturers of the United States
2006 establishments in Utah
2016 mergers and acquisitions